YQ may refer to:

 YQ (airline), a defunct American airline
 Polet Airlines (IATA code YQ), a Russian airline
 Young Quaker, a monthly magazine
 Yukon Quest, a sled dog race in Alaska

See also
QY (disambiguation)

fr:YQ